OCS or Ocs may refer to:

Places 
 Öcs, a village in Veszprém county, Hungary
 Outer Continental Shelf, a maritime federal land zone beyond the jurisdiction of the United States

Music 
 Ocean Colour Scene, an English rock group
 Thee Oh Sees, an American experimental rock band

Psychiatry and medicine 
 Obsessive-compulsive syndrome or obsessive-compulsive disorder, a psychiatric anxiety disorder
 Ontario Cannabis Store, the store name of the Ontario Cannabis Retail Corporation
Oral corticosteroid

Science and technology 
 Open Collaboration Services, for integration of web services and communities into desktop and mobile applications, an open and vendor-independent API
 Office of the Chief Scientist (Australia), a part of Department of Innovation, Industry, Science and Research
 Amiga Original chipset, a Commodore Amiga chipset
 Carbonyl sulfide, a chemical compound with the formula OCS
 Microsoft Office Communications Server, a software product
 OCS Inventory (Open Computer and Software Inventory), an application which inventories IT assets
 Online charging system, a system allowing providers of communication services to charge customers based on service usage
 Overhead contact system, a system which provides electric power to trains

Schools and alumni associations 
 Officer candidate school, a training establishment in many countries where military officers are trained
 Oklahoma Christian School
 Old Cliftonian Society, the society for the alumni of Clifton College, Bristol, England
 Opelika City Schools, a school district headquartered in Opelika, Alabama, United States
 Senator O'Connor College School in Toronto, Ontario, Canada

Other uses 
 Corisco International Airport, IATA airport code "OCS"
 Federation of Old Cornwall Societies or sometimes OCS, a Cornish history charity
 OCS (TV channel), a group of French pay television networks dedicated to films and series operated by Orange S.A.
 Old Church Slavonic, a Slavic language which developed in the 9th century
 Office of Community Services, a US Federal Government agency
 Officer candidate school, a military school
 On course side, a term meaning that a sailboat has crossed the start line of a race early
 Operational Combat Series, a game series from The Gamers and Multi-Man Publishing
 Ontario Cannabis Retail Corporation, a legal cannabis distributor in Canada

See also
 OC (disambiguation) for the singular of "OCs"